Kingseat is a village in Fife, Scotland, approximately  northeast of Dunfermline. It was originally a coal mining village with the first pits sunk in the area in 1800. The name of the village is thought locally to have originated from when the king would visit the area to look out onto the River Forth and to Arthur's Seat.

Amenities
The village has a public park which includes a play area and a football pitch. There is also a Community Leisure Centre, a bowling club, a cattery, and formerly a shop with a post office. The shop and post office has now been converted into a house.

There used to be a hotel in the centre of the village, The Halfway House, but it closed unexpectedly in early 2015. The building was demolished in November 2020.

The village does not have its own primary school and instead falls under the catchment area for Townhill Primary School.

References

Villages in Fife
Mining communities in Fife
Areas of Dunfermline